Diaugia is a genus of bristle flies in the family Tachinidae. There is at least one described species in Diaugia, D. angusta.

Distribution
Brazil.

References

Dexiinae
Diptera of South America
Monotypic Brachycera genera
Tachinidae genera
Taxa named by Maximilian Perty